Francis Hermann Bohlen (July 31, 1868 – December 9, 1942) was an American legal scholar from Pennsylvania who specialized in tort law and served as the Algernon Sydney Biddle professor of law at the University of Pennsylvania Law School.

Biography
Bohlen was born in Chestnut Hill, Philadelphia, Pennsylvania, to John and Priscilla Murray Bohlen. He was a descendant of the von Bohlen family of Prussia. He attended Miss Havens School in Philadelphia. He graduated from St. Paul’s School in Concord, New Hampshire (1884), the University of Pennsylvania (Bachelor of Laws, 1892), and the University of Pennsylvania Law School (Doctor of Laws, 1930).

Apart from his scholarship, he was a well-known cricket player who was considered one of the best amateurs in America, traveling to compete in England and playing for London County Cricket Club, Marylebone Cricket Club, Free Foresters, and the Philadelphian cricket team.

Bohlen was the Algernon Sydney Biddle professor of law at the University of Pennsylvania Law School. He was an expert on the law of torts, and also taught evidence and contracts. He retired from teaching in 1937. He was known as a leading theorist of the Realist years in torts theory, though he was not a Realist himself.

Among his writings were A Short Selection of Cases on the Law of Torts: Texas, and Other Cases on Torts (Bobbs-Merrill, 1933), Commentaries on Torts: Restatement, Issue 3 (American Law Institute, 1927), and Studies in the law of torts (Bobbs-Merrill Company, 1926).

He died on December 9, 1942, in Wynnewood, Pennsylvania, at age 74.  He is interred in the Bohlen family crypt at Laurel Hill Cemetery in Philadelphia.

References 

1868 births
1942 deaths
20th-century American lawyers
A. J. Webbe's XI cricketers
American legal scholars
American people of Prussian descent
Burials at Laurel Hill Cemetery (Philadelphia)
Cricketers from Philadelphia
Lawyers from Philadelphia
London County cricketers
Marylebone Cricket Club cricketers
Philadelphian cricketers
Scholars of contract law
Scholars of tort law
Scholars of evidence law
St. Paul's School (New Hampshire) alumni
University of Pennsylvania alumni
University of Pennsylvania Law School alumni
University of Pennsylvania Law School faculty
American cricketers